The 2002 Estonian Football season was the 11th full year of competitive football (soccer) in Estonia since the nation gained independence from the Soviet Union in 1991-08-20.

National Leagues

Meistriliiga

Esiliiga

Estonian FA Cup

Final

Estonian Super Cup

National team

External links
2002 season on RSSSF
RSSSF Historic Results
RSSSF National Team Results

 
Seasons in Estonian football